Kew Bay is an Arctic waterway in Qikiqtaaluk Region, Nunavut, Canada. It is located off northern Bathurst Island. It connects to Penny Strait to the east.

References

Bays of Qikiqtaaluk Region